Michael Cudahy may refer to:
Michael Cudahy (electronics) (1924–2022), entrepreneur, business executive and philanthropist
Michael Cudahy (industrialist) (1841–1910), American meat packing company owner
Michael Cudahy, aka The Millionaire, member of musical group Combustible Edison